Plagiotriptus is a genus of thericleid orthopterans. It includes the following species:

Plagiotriptus alca
Plagiotriptus carli
Plagiotriptus hippiscus
Plagiotriptus leei
Plagiotriptus loricatus
Plagiotriptus parvulus
Plagiotriptus peterseni
Plagiotriptus pinivorus
Plagiotriptus somalicus

References 

Caelifera genera